Ninjor may refer to:

Ninjor (Power Rangers), fictional character from the Power Rangers franchise
Ninjor (Masters of the Universe), fictional character from the Masters of the Universe franchise